Lac-Boulé is an unorganized territory in the Mauricie region of Quebec, Canada, part of the Mékinac Regional County Municipality.

References

Unorganized territories in Mauricie